The 2018 South American Aerobic Gymnastics Championships were held in Lima, Peru, from July 10 to 15, 2018. The competition was organized by the Peruvian Gymnastics Federation and approved by the International Gymnastics Federation.

Medalists

References

2018 in gymnastics
International gymnastics competitions hosted by Peru
2018 in Peruvian sport
South American Gymnastics Championships